Rolf Weber (born 22 September 1934) is a Swiss modern pentathlete. He competed at the 1960 Summer Olympics.

References

1934 births
Living people
Swiss male modern pentathletes
Olympic modern pentathletes of Switzerland
Modern pentathletes at the 1960 Summer Olympics
Sportspeople from Bern